In combustion physics, fuel mass fraction is the ratio of fuel mass flow to the total mass flow of a fuel mixture. If an air flow is fuel free, the fuel mass fraction is zero; in pure fuel without trapped gases, the ratio is unity. As fuel is burned in a combustion process, the fuel mass fraction is reduced. The definition reads as

where 
 is the mass of the fuel in the mixture
 is the total mass of the mixture

References

Chemical physics
Combustion
Engineering ratios